Herman Sjögrell (born 8 May 2001) is a Swedish football midfielder who plays for Örgryte IS on loan from IK Sirius.

References

2001 births
Living people
Swedish footballers
Association football midfielders
Örgryte IS players
IK Sirius Fotboll players
Superettan players
Allsvenskan players